Bouchercon is an annual convention of creators and devotees of mystery and detective fiction. It is named in honour of writer, reviewer, and editor Anthony Boucher, who is also the inspiration for the Anthony Awards, which have been issued at the convention since 1986. This page details Bouchercon XL and the 24th Anthony Awards ceremony.

Bouchercon
The convention was held in Indianapolis, Indiana on October 15, 2009; running until the 18th. The event was chaired by critical / non-fiction writer and owner of The Mystery Company bookshop Jim Huang; and Mike Bursaw, owner of the Indianapolis "Mystery Mike's" book store.

Special Guests
Lifetime Achievement award — Allen J. Hubin
Guest of Honor — Michael Connelly
Toastmaster — S. J. Rozan
Honored Youth Author — Wendelin Van Draanen
Fan Guest of Honor — Kathryn Kennison

Anthony Awards
The following list details the awards distributed at the twenty-fourth annual Anthony Awards ceremony, located at the Hilbert Circle Theatre.

Novel award
Winner:
Michael Connelly, The Brass Verdict

Shortlist:
Sean Chercover, Trigger City
William Kent Krueger, Red Knife
Stieg Larsson, The Girl with the Dragon Tattoo
Louise Penny, The Cruelest Month

First novel award
Winner:
Stieg Larsson, The Girl with the Dragon Tattoo

Shortlist:
Rosemary Harris, Pushing Up Daisies
Julie Kramer, Stalking Susan
G. M. Malliet, Death of a Cozy Writer
Tom Rob Smith, Child 44

Paperback original award
Winner:
Julie Hyzy, State of the Onion

Shortlist:
Max Allan Collins, The First Quarry
Christa Faust, Money Shot
Vicki Lane, In a Dark Season
P. J. Parrish, South of Hell

Short story award
Winner:
Sean Chercover, "A Sleep Not Unlike Death", from Hardcore Hardboiled

Shortlist:
Dana Cameron, "The Night Things Changed", from Wolfsbane and Mistletoe
Jane K. Cleland, "Killing Time", from Alfred Hitchcock's Mystery Magazine November 2008
Toni L. P. Kelner, "Skull and Cross-Examinations", from Ellery Queen's Mystery Magazine February 2008
Laura Lippman, "Scratch a Woman", from Hardly Knew Her
Kristine Kathryn Rusch, "The Secret Lives of Cats", from Ellery Queen's Mystery Magazine July 2008

Critical / Non-fiction award
Winner:
Jeffrey Marks, Anthony Boucher: A Biobibliography

Shortlist:
Frankie Y. Bailey, African American Mystery Writers: A Historical and Thematic Study
Kathy Lynn Emerson, How to Write Killer Historical Mysteries
Kate Summerscale, The Suspicions of Mr. Whicher: A Shocking Murder and the Undoing of a Great Victorian Detective

Young adult award
Winner:
Chris Grabenstein, The Crossroads

Shortlist:
John Green, Paper Towns
Lauren Henderson, Kiss Me, Kill Me
Trenton Lee Stewart, The Mysterious Benedict Society and the Perilous Journey
Wendelin Van Draanen, Sammy Keyes and the Cold Hard Cash

Cover art award
Winner:
Peter Mendelsund; for Stieg Larsson, The Girl with the Dragon Tattoo

Shortlist:
David Rotstein; for Linda L. Richards, Death Was the Other Woman
David Rotstein; for Elizabeth Zelvin, Death Will Get You Sober
David Rotstein; for Louise Ure, The Fault Tree
Steve Cooley; for Christa Faust, Money Shot

Special service award
Winner:
Jon Jordan and Ruth Jordan, Crimespree Magazine

Shortlist:
Ali Karim, Shots magazine
David Montgomery
Gary Warren Niebuhr
Sarah Weinman

References

Anthony Awards
40
2009 in Indiana